Penicillaria simplex is a moth of the family Euteliidae first described by Francis Walker in 1865. It is found from the Oriental tropics east to New Guinea.

References

Moths described in 1865
Euteliinae